"Indie music" is a shorthand form of "independent music" that loosely describes music that is produced without the assistance of major commercial record labels or their subsidiaries.

Indie music may also refer to:

 Indie electronic, a style of indie rock and electronic music that originated in the 1990s, also sometimes known as Indietronica
 Indie folk, a style of folk music from the 1990s
 Indie pop, also known simply as "indie"
 Indie rock, a style of alternative rock from the 1980s
 Indie hip-hop or Underground hip-hop, an umbrella term for hip-hop music that is outside the general commercial canon
 Indie R&B or Alternative R&B, a style of contemporary R&B music that combines elements of R&B with pop, rock, hip-hop, electronic, soul, funk, indie, and alternative rock.
 Indie soul or Neo soul, a genre of popular music that combines elements of soul with pop, rock, hip-hop, R&B, jazz, funk, soul, electronic and others.
 Indie dance or Alternative dance, a musical genre that mixes alternative rock with electronic dance music
 Indie rave or Madchester, a style of indie music from the late 1980s and early 1990s

See also
 Indie music scene
 Indie label
 Lo-fi music
 Indian music